Serge Trinchero (born 27 August 1949 in Biella) is a retired Swiss/Italian footballer who played as a defender.

External links

1949 births
Living people
Swiss men's footballers
Association football defenders
FC Sion players
Servette FC players
Neuchâtel Xamax FCS players
FC Martigny-Sports players
Switzerland international footballers